Parsada was a town of ancient Lydia, inhabited during Byzantine times. Its name does not occur among ancient authors, but is inferred from epigraphic and other evidence.

Its site is located near Bağyurdu (formerly Parsa) in Asiatic Turkey.

References

Populated places in ancient Lydia
Former populated places in Turkey
Populated places of the Byzantine Empire
History of İzmir Province
Kemalpaşa District